The 1953 NCAA Wrestling Championships were the 23rd NCAA Wrestling Championships to be held. Penn State University in State College, Pennsylvania hosted the tournament at Rec Hall.

Penn State took home the team championship with 21 points and having one individual champion.

Frank Bettucci of Cornell College was named the Most Outstanding Wrestler.

Team results

Individual finals

References 

NCAA Division I Wrestling Championship
Wrestling competitions in the United States
NCAA Wrestling Championships
NCAA Wrestling Championships
NCAA Wrestling Championships
Wrestling in Pennsylvania